Dariya Nedashkovska (born 14 October 1984) is a Ukrainian fencer. She competed in the women's individual sabre event at the 2004 Summer Olympics.

References

External links
 

1984 births
Living people
Ukrainian female sabre fencers
Olympic fencers of Ukraine
Fencers at the 2004 Summer Olympics
People from Kalush, Ukraine
Sportspeople from Ivano-Frankivsk Oblast
20th-century Ukrainian women
21st-century Ukrainian women